ISO 12944 is an international standard on corrosion protection of steel structures by protective paint systems. It consists of several parts:
 Part 1: General introduction
 Part 2: Classification of environments
 Part 3: Design considerations
 Part 4: Types of surface and surface preparation
 Part 5: Protective paint systems
 Part 6: Laboratory performance test methods and associated assessment criteria
 Part 7: Execution and supervision of paint work
 Part 8: Development of specifications for new work and maintenance
 Part 9: Protective paint systems and laboratory performance test methods for offshore and related structures

See also
 EN 1993 Eurocode 3 – Design of steel structures (a European Standard that references ISO 12944)

References
 ISO 12944-5: Paints and varnishes – Corrosion protection of steel structures by protective paint systems – Part 5: Protective paint systems, 2007-09-15.
 ISO 12944-5 page on iso.org

12944